Lars Ulrich  (born 26 December 1963) is a Danish musician best known as the drummer and co-founder of American heavy metal band Metallica. The son and grandson respectively of tennis players Torben and Einer Ulrich, he played tennis in his youth and moved to Los Angeles at age 16 to train professionally. However, rather than playing tennis, Ulrich began playing drums. After publishing an advertisement in The Recycler, Ulrich met James Hetfield and formed Metallica. Along with Hetfield, Ulrich has songwriting credits on almost all of the band's songs, and the two of them are the only remaining original members of the band.

Early life
Ulrich was born into an upper-middle-class family in Gentofte, Denmark; the son of Lone (née Sylvester-Hvid) and tennis player Torben Ulrich. His paternal grandfather was tennis player Einer Ulrich. His paternal grandmother, Ulla Meyer, was from a Jewish family; as a result, Ulrich's grandfather was persecuted by the Nazis during World War II. Saxophonist Dexter Gordon was Ulrich's godfather, and he is a childhood friend of musician Neneh Cherry.

In February 1973, Ulrich's father obtained passes for five of his friends to a Deep Purple concert held in the same Copenhagen stadium as one of his tennis tournaments. When one of the friends could not go, they gave their ticket to the nine-year-old Lars, who was mesmerized by the performance and bought the band's album Fireball the next day. The concert and album had a considerable impact on Ulrich, inspiring the start of his music career.

As a result of his newfound interest in music, he received his first drum kit, a Ludwig, from his grandmother around the age of 12 or 13. Ulrich originally intended to follow in his father's footsteps and play tennis, and he moved to Newport Beach, California, in the summer of 1980. Despite being ranked in the top ten tennis players of his age group in Denmark, Ulrich failed to make it into the seven man Corona del Mar High School tennis team, contributing to his decision to focus on music.

In the documentary Anvil! The Story of Anvil, Ulrich states that witnessing a Y&T show was his defining moment in deciding to become a musician. In 1981, he discovered British heavy metal band Diamond Head. He was excited about the band's style of music after purchasing their debut album Lightning to the Nations, and traveled from San Francisco to London to see the band perform live at the Woolwich Odeon. Ulrich remains a fan of Diamond Head and would later mix their album The Best of Diamond Head. Upon returning to America, Ulrich placed an advert in a local classifieds newspaper looking for musicians to start a band with him. James Hetfield replied to the ad, and Metallica was formed.

Career
Later in 1981, Ulrich met James Hetfield in Downey, California, and they formed the heavy metal band Metallica upon Ulrich securing a spot in a compilation album of local metal bands named Metal Massacre. He got the band name from a friend, Ron Quintana, who was brainstorming names for a heavy metal fanzine he was creating, and Metallica was one of the options, the other being "Metal Mania." Ulrich encouraged him to choose Metal Mania, and used the name Metallica for himself.

He became known as a pioneer of fast thrash drum beats, featured on many of Metallica's early songs, such as "Metal Militia" from Kill 'Em All, "Fight Fire with Fire" from Ride the Lightning, "Battery" and "Damage Inc." from Master of Puppets and "Dyers Eve" from ...And Justice for All. He has since been considerably influential due to both the popularity of his band, as well as his drum techniques, such as the double bass drum in the song "One" (...And Justice for All) and  "Dyers Eve". Since the release of Metallica, Ulrich adopted a less focused and simplified style of drumming, and reduced his kit from a 9-piece to a 7-piece.

Between 1998 and 2002, Ulrich tried running a record label, the Music Company. The company was a joint venture with Metallica accountant Tim Duffy. It failed to catch on and folded in the spring 2002. His voice can be heard in the opening seconds of "Leper Messiah" and he also counts to four in his native Danish on the "St. Anger" music video. To unwind after some gigs, Ulrich listens to jazz.

He made his acting debut in the HBO original film Hemingway & Gellhorn, which began filming in March 2011 and was released on 28 May  2012. Ulrich made a brief cameo appearance as himself in the film Get Him to the Greek, as the partner of the character Jackie Q. In 2012, Ulrich was the focus of the documentary film, Mission to Lars. The film by Kate and Will Spicer concerns their journey with their brother Tom, who lives in a care home in Devon, England and who has Fragile X syndrome, to try to meet Ulrich at one of Metallica's 2009 gigs in California.

In 2017 Ulrich began hosting a show on Apple Music called It's Electric, which has featured conversations with Joan Jett, Noel Gallagher, Dave Grohl and Jerry Cantrell.

Drumming style

Ulrich's drumming style has changed throughout his career. During the 1980s he was known for his fast, aggressive thrash beats. Unlike most drummers, Ulrich does not have a ride cymbal in his kit and instead favors the China cymbal. He said that he does not like the "ding" sound of the former and prefers the loudness of the latter.

Ulrich consciously simplified his style in the 1990s to support the hard rock-oriented songwriting of Metallica's albums during that period. He restored some of his earlier thrash metal techniques for the band's 2016 album Hardwired... to Self-Destruct, which saw a more aggressive and experimental drumming style from Ulrich.

Personal life
In 2009, Ulrich revealed he suffered from tinnitus due to many years of touring without the use of any auditory protection.

Relationships
Ulrich's first marriage was in 1988 to Debbie Jones, a British woman he met on tour, but they divorced in 1990 during the recordings of the Black album. 

His second marriage was to Skylar Satenstein, an emergency medicine physician, from 1997 to 2004. They had two sons before divorcing. Layne and Myles formed a band called Tapei Houston.

Following his divorce from Satenstein, Ulrich dated Danish actress Connie Nielsen from 2004 to 2012. They had one child together. He married American fashion model Jessica Miller in 2015.

Interests and philanthropy
Ulrich is a friend of Noel Gallagher and his former band Oasis and claimed Gallagher was his inspiration to give up cocaine in 2008.

Ulrich also has a passion for fine art. In 2002 Ulrich sold a painting from his own collection, Self Portrait by Jean-Michel Basquiat, 1982. With a pre-sale price estimate of $5 million, it ultimately sold for triple that at Christie's Auction House.

Ulrich has been an activist in support of expanding access to health care for U.S. citizens, with his family working with the Haight Ashbury Free Clinic of San Francisco, California. He raised $32,000 for the group during a celebrity edition of the game show Who Wants to Be a Millionaire?.

Napster 
In April 2000, Ulrich became a vocal opponent of Napster and file sharing as Metallica filed a lawsuit against the company for copyright infringement and racketeering. In July 2000, he testified before the Senate Judiciary Committee after Metallica's entire catalogue, including the then-unfinished track "I Disappear" was found to be freely available for download on the service. The case was settled out-of-court, resulting in more than 300,000 Napster users being banned from the service.

Awards and honors
When Ulrich and fellow Metallica members James Hetfield, Jason Newsted, Cliff Burton, Kirk Hammett, and Robert Trujillo were inducted into the Rock and Roll Hall of Fame in 2009, Ulrich was the first Dane to receive the honor.

Having led a campaign for several years to get his longtime favorite band, Deep Purple, inducted into the Rock and Roll Hall of Fame, Ulrich delivered the induction speech when the band went into the Hall in 2016.

Ulrich was knighted in his native country of Denmark. He was awarded the Knight's Cross of the Order of the Dannebrog on 26 May 2017 by Margrethe II.

Equipment

Ulrich plays a Tama Starclassic Maple drum kit, with a Deeper Purple finish. From 2008 to 2016 he used the same kit but in orange. His cymbals are made by Zildjian.

Discography

Metallica
All Metallica albums. For a complete list, see Metallica discography.
 Kill 'Em All (1983)
 Ride the Lightning (1984)
 Master of Puppets (1986)
 ...And Justice for All (1988)
 Metallica (1991)
 Load (1996)
 Reload (1997)
 St. Anger (2003)
 Death Magnetic (2008)
 Hardwired... to Self-Destruct (2016)
 72 Seasons (2023)

Guest appearances
 Mercyful Fate – In the Shadows (guest on the bonus track "Return of the Vampire ... 1993")

Filmography

References

Further reading

External links

 And Justice for All Kit for Roland Vdrums TD12
 
 Lars Ulrich's kit setup, themusicedge.com
 Lars Ulrich profile Drummerworld.com 
 New York Times article about Ulrich's art collection, nytimes.com
 Rock 'n' Roll Hall of Fame: Metallica, Fuse.tv 
 Video Interview In New Zealand, ripitup.co.nz
 
 
 
 
 
 
 

1963 births
American people of Danish-Jewish descent
American people of German-Jewish descent
Danish art collectors
Danish emigrants to the United States
Danish expatriates in the United States
Danish heavy metal drummers
Danish people of German-Jewish descent
Living people
Metal Church members
Metallica members
People from Gentofte Municipality